was an experimental light cruiser built between 1922 and 1923 for the Imperial Japanese Navy (IJN). Although a test bed for various new designs and technologies, she was commissioned as a front-line warship and participated in numerous combat operations during World War II before she was sunk by the USS Bluegill. Designs pioneered on Yūbari had a major impact on future Japanese warship designs.

Background
Construction of an experimental light cruiser was authorized under the 1917 8-4 Fleet Program but funding was not available until 1921. Yūbari was designed as an experimental scout cruiser that would have the combat potential of the standard  Sendai-class cruiser but with a much lighter displacement. Captain Yuzuru Hiraga, Japan's leading naval architect, assisted by Lieutenant Commander Kikuo Fujimoto, developed an innovative design which strongly influenced the design of Japan's subsequent heavy cruisers, as well as destroyers.

Design

The basic design premise of Yūbari was that the highest possible speed and weaponry be maintained with the greatest possible weight reduction. To save weight, the armor was integrated directly into the hull structure, forming the side walls and deck. Yūbari had  of belt armor protecting the machinery spaces and gun magazines, and  armor for the deck and bridge, giving the vessel far superior armor than the previous 5000-ton cruiser designs. The forecastle was given significant flare to improve seakeeping.

Propulsion was similar to that of a destroyer, with eight oil-fired Kampon boilers feeding three turbine engines, generating . However, the exhaust was trunked into a single centrally-located smokestack, reducing the overall length of the design and freeing deck space.

The main battery consisted of six 14 cm/50 3rd Year Type naval guns mounted in two twin gun turrets and two single gun turrets located on the centre line of the ship's axis in an arrangement which allowed one single and one twin turret to fire over the bow or stern. A single 8 cm/40 3rd Year Type naval gun and two 7.7 mm machine guns were located amidships on a raised platform for anti-aircraft defense. Two twin-mount torpedo launchers were also on the centerline of the ship's axis, one fore and aft of the anti-aircraft gun platform, with four loaded and four reserve Type 93 torpedoes. The fire control system was centralized into an enlarged bridge.

The use of new technologies and unproven designs led to a number of issues which only became apparent once Yūbari was commissioned. The smoke stack was found to draw poorly, and was enlarged by 1.80 meters in 1924. Additional ballast was also added to increase stability. In 1932, the 80mm anti-aircraft gun was removed and in 1935, two twin Type 93  guns were fitted. These were replaced by two twin 25mm guns in 1940.

Yūbari had a significant refit in early 1944 when the two single /50 main guns were removed and replaced by one Type 10 /45 gun (in the "A" position) and six twin and one triple Type 96 25-mm AA guns together with a Type 22 search radar and two depth charge launchers.

Service history
Yūbari was laid down on 5 June 1922, launched on 5 March 1923 and completed at Sasebo Naval Arsenal, and commissioned on 23 July 1923.

Completed just prior to the 1923 Great Kantō earthquake, Yūbari was quickly pressed into service to help evacuate refugees from Yokohama and other stricken areas. During this time (10 September 1923), Crown Prince Hirohito also visited the vessel while at Yokosuka. In April 1925, Yūbari shadowed maneuvers of the United States Navy off of Oahu. American destroyers gave chase, but Yūbari was able to outrun them. She was reassigned to the reserves in November 1933.

In November 1934, Captain Tadashige Daigo assumed command, and Yūbari was reassigned to the Yokosuka Naval District, where she was modernized and refitted in November 1935. Afterwards, she was assigned to patrols off of the China coast. With the start of the Second Sino-Japanese War in August 1937, Yūbari assisted in the evacuation of Japanese civilians from coastal cities in southern China. Subsequently, she was sent north to cover landings by the Imperial Japanese Army at Hangzhou on 20 October. She returned to Yokosuka and was reassigned to the reserves in December of the same year. She was sent from March through October 1939 to the Ōminato Guard District to patrol the coast of Sakhalin .
At the time of the attack on Pearl Harbor, Yūbari was flagship of Destroyer Squadron Six of the IJN 4th Fleet, tasked with the defense of the South Seas Mandate, and was based out of Truk from late 1941 through 1942.

Early in the war, Yūbari was the flagship for the Japanese invasion force during the invasion of Wake Island. She led both invasion attempts on 11 and 23 December 1941. During shore bombardment operations, she was bracketed by gunfire from the USMC defenders, but took no damage.

Subsequently, Yūbari and her destroyers participated in the capture of Rabaul and New Ireland in the Solomon Islands, followed by the Invasion of Salamaua–Lae on 8 March 1942. On 10 March, she was attacked by two Douglas SBD-3 Dauntless dive bombers from the aircraft carrier , which scored two severe near-misses that killed a number of her anti-aircraft gun crews. She was then strafed by four Grumman F4F-3 Wildcat fighters from Lexington, which killed her executive officer and several crewmen on her bridge. Yorktown'''s SBD-3s detonated gunpowder bags near her No. 2 turret, which set the protective mattresses around the bridge on fire, and an F4F-3 strafing run detonated gasoline drums stored in her port lifeboat. Firefighting teams found the fire hoses too short due to a design error and the fire threatened the forward torpedo mount. The captain ordered the torpedoes jettisoned but the mount would not rotate due to a power failure, forcing the crew to use pulleys and ropes to dump the torpedoes manually. During this battle Yūbari evaded 67 bombs and 12 torpedoes, suffering 13 killed and 49 wounded. She was bombed again on 10 March by four USAAF B-17 Flying Fortress bombers while returning to Rabaul with four near-misses opening three large holes in her stern. She returned to Truk for repairs on 25 March.Yūbari was next assigned as the flagship of the Port Moresby Attack Force during Operation MO on 4 May. On 7 May she escaped an attack by four B-17 bombers without damage and rescued a number of survivors from the aircraft carrier , which had been sunk earlier. She returned to Truk on 13 May when the operation was cancelled following the Battle of the Coral Sea. She returned to Yokosuka for refit from 19 May to 19 June

Beginning 29 June 1942, Yūbari took part in the Solomon Islands Campaign, including landing personnel on Guadalcanal to construct an airfield. Yūbari participated in the Battle of Savo Island on 9 August.Dull, A Battle History..., p. 187 She scored several hits on the American destroyer , and one of the torpedoes that sank the heavy cruiser  has been attributed to her.

From 20 August, Yūbari was based out of Truk, making patrols between Truk and the Marshall islands, Gilbert Islands, and Palau. She was based at Tarawa from 20 October to 20 November as a guard ship.
She returned to Yokosuka at the end of December, where her middle turbine was repaired and additional anti-aircraft weaponry was installed in February 1943. She returned to Rabaul on 1 April and was assigned to the Southwest Area Fleet. On 2 July, Yūbari and her destroyers bombarded the American beachhead established at Rendova Island, but with little effect. On her return to Buin, Yūbari struck a naval mine, damaging her bow and wounding 26 crewmen. The damage also limited her speed to 22 knots and forced a return to Yokosuka for repairs from August through October. In addition to repairs, additional anti-aircraft guns, a Type 22 surface search radar and Type 94 sonar were installed. She returned to Rabaul on 3 November. On 4 November, she rescued 196 troops and three artillery pieces from the transport Kiyosumi Maru, which had been damaged by a bombing attack the previous day. On 6 November, she undertook a "Tokyo Express" transport run with 700 troops from the IJA 17th Division and 25 tons of supplies to Bougainville Island. Yūbari was damaged slightly by a strafing attack in the 11 November Carrier Raid on Rabaul, and again on 14 November. On 18 November, she attempted another troop transport run to Garove Island in New Britain, but the mission was cancelled after Yūbari was damaged in an attack by USAAF B-24 Liberators and USN PBY Catalinas. She returned to Yokosuka on 19 December for repairs and the installation of yet more anti-aircraft guns. She returned to Saipan on 30 March 1944, and Palau on 25 AprilYūbari was sighted on 27 April 1944 off Palau by the USN submarine  on her first war patrol. Bluegill fired six torpedoes, of which Yūbari managed to evade four, but two hit on her starboard side near her Number 1 boiler room. Soon afterwards, her Number 2 boiler room was also flooded. She attempted to get underway using only her middle shaft, but the attempt failed, as did an attempt by the accompanying destroyer  to take her in tow. Yūbari'' sank almost 24 hours after being torpedoed, at position , with the loss of 19 crewmen. She was officially removed from the navy list on 10 June 1944.

Notes

References

External links

 tabular record:  CombinedFleet.com: ‘‘Yūbari’’  history

Cruisers of the Imperial Japanese Navy
Ships built by Sasebo Naval Arsenal
1923 ships
Experimental ships
Second Sino-Japanese War cruisers of Japan
World War II cruisers of Japan
Ships sunk by American submarines
World War II shipwrecks in the Philippine Sea
Battle of Wake Island
Maritime incidents in April 1944